Rama Manikya (d. 1676), also called Ram Manikya or Ramdev Manikya, was the Maharaja of Tripura from 1676 to 1685.

Life
The eldest son of Maharaja Govinda Manikya, as a prince Rama acted as one of his father's military commanders. In December 1661, he was dispatched against his rebellious uncle Nakshatra Roy and engaged him in the Battle of Amtali, during which Rama was defeated. This loss forced his father to temporarily abandon the throne and leave Tripura for a number of years.

Following Govinda's death in 1676, Rama ascended the throne, though he soon faced rebellion from his nephew Dwarika Thakur. The latter assumed the royal title Narendra Manikya and with the aid of Nasir Muhammad, the Afghan Nawab of Sarail, overthrew Rama. The deposed king turned to the Mughal governor of Bengal, Shaista Khan, for aid. The latter dispatched his army in Rama's support, allowing him to recapture the throne, with Khan taking Narendra captive to Dhaka.

At some point, Rama led an incursion north towards Sylhet, reaching as far as the city borders. In Tripura itself, he performed extensive infrastructure development, excavating several tanks (reservoirs) and erecting temples. One such was in honour of Vishnu (suggesting a personal affinity with Vaishnavism) as well as repairing the Temple of Tripura Sundari, which had previously been damaged from lightning strike. Many villages located throughout modern-day Tripura State and Bangladesh are named in his honour.

Rama died in old age in 1685, with his consort Ratnavati performing Sati in his funeral pyre. He was succeeded by his son Ratna Manikya II, at the time only five years old.

Notes

References

Kings of Tripura
History of Tripura
1685 deaths